Upper Benefield is a linear village along the A427 road in the North Northamptonshire district of Northamptonshire, England. It is part of the civil parish of Benefield. It is around 10 km (6 miles) east of Corby.

The village's name means 'Bera's people's open land'.

References

External links 

Villages in Northamptonshire
North Northamptonshire